Foyn Point is a point surmounted by a peak  high, forming the southeast extremity of Blagoevgrad Peninsula and marking the north side of the entrance to Exasperation Inlet, on Oscar II Coast on the east side of Graham Land, Antarctica. Subsequent comparison of Wilkins' photographs of this feature with those taken by the Falkland Islands Dependencies Survey, who charted the coast in 1947, indicate that this point, although considerably north of the position reported by Wilkins, is the feature named by him as "Foyn Island". The name Foyn Point is given to the southeast extremity of this feature. It is named for Svend Foyn.

Further reading 
 Defense Mapping Agency  1992, Sailing Directions (planning Guide) and (enroute) for Antarctica, P 276
 Grace A. Nield, Valentina R. Barletta, Andrea Bordoni, Matt A. King, Pippa L. Whitehouse, Peter J. Clarke, Eugene Domack, Ted A. Scambos, Etienne Berthier, Rapid bedrock uplift in the Antarctic Peninsula explained by viscoelastic response to recent ice unloading
 M. R. Cape, Maria Vernet, Pedro Skvarca, Sebastián Marinsek, Ted Scambos, Eugene Domack, Foehn winds link climate‐driven warming to ice shelf evolution in Antarctica ,  https://doi.org/10.1002/2015JD023465

External links

 Foyn Point on USGS website
 Foyn Point on AADC website
 Foyn Point on SCAR website
 Foyn Point on marineregions.org
 Foyn Point long term updated weather forecast

References 

Headlands of Graham Land
Foyn Coast